Micron is a monthly peer-reviewed scientific journal in the field of microscopy. It was established in 1969 and is published by Elsevier.

External links 
 

Monthly journals
English-language journals
Elsevier academic journals
Biology journals
Publications established in 1969